Renmin (unless otherwise noted) may refer to:

Renmin University of China
People's Daily, daily newspaper of the People's Republic of China
Renmin, Heilongjiang (任民镇), town in Anda, Heilongjiang, China

Subdistricts in China
Renmin Subdistrict, Guangzhou, Guangdong
Renmin Subdistrict, Hengyang, Hunan
Renmin Subdistrict, Weinan, Shaanxi

See also
Renmin Road Subdistrict (disambiguation)
Renmin Street Subdistrict (disambiguation)
Renminbi, Chinese currency
People (disambiguation)